Wong Ka Wai is a village in Tuen Mun, Tuen Mun District, Hong Kong.

Administration
Wong Ka Wai is a recognized village under the New Territories Small House Policy.

History
Salt fields were historically farmed at Wong Ka Wai. Other salt fields were in Tai O on Lantau Island, San Hui in Tuen Mun, Yim Liu Ha in Sha Tau Kok, Yim Tin Tsai in Sai Kung and Yim Tin Tsai in Tai Po.

At the time of the 1911 census, the population of Wong Ka Wai was 50. The number of males was 20.

References

Villages in Tuen Mun District, Hong Kong
Tuen Mun